Eugen is a masculine given name which may refer to:

 Archduke Eugen of Austria (1863–1954), last Habsburg Grandmaster of the Teutonic Order from 1894 to 1923
 Prince Eugen, Duke of Närke (1865–1947), Swedish painter, art collector, and patron of artists
 Prince Eugen of Schaumburg-Lippe (1899–1929)
 Prince Eugen of Bavaria (1925–1997)
 Eugen Aburel (1899–1975), Romanian surgeon and obstetrician
 Eugen Bacon, female African-Australian author
 Eugen Beza (born 1978), Romanian football manager and former player
 Eugen Bleuler (1857–1939), Swiss psychiatrist and eugenicist
 Eugen von Böhm-Bawerk (1851–1914), Austrian economist
 Eugen Bolz (1881–1945), German politician and member of the anti-Nazi resistance
 Eugen Chirnoagă (1891–1965), Romanian chemist
 Eugen Cicero (1940–1997), Romanian-German jazz pianist
 Eugen Ciucă (1913–2005), Romanian-American artist 
 Eugen d'Albert (1864–1932), Scottish-born pianist and composer
 Eugen Doga (born 1937), Romanian composer from Moldova
 Eugen Drewermann (born 1940), German church critic, theologian, peace activist, and former Catholic priest
 Eugen Dühring (1833–1921), German philosopher, positivist, economist and socialist
 Eugen Fischer (1874–1967), German professor of medicine, anthropology, and eugenics and Nazi
 Eugen Fischer (historian) (1899–1973), German geologist and historian
 Eugen Goldstein (1850–1930), German physicist working with discharge tubes
 Eugen Grimminger (1892–1986), a member of the anti-Nazi White Rose resistance group in Germany
 Eugen Peter Jeljenic, birth name of Gene Rayburn (1917–1999), American gameshow host and radio personality
 Eugen Jochum (1902–1987), German conductor
 Eugen Landau (1852–1935), German banker and philanthropist
 Eugen Leviné (1883–1919), German communist revolutionary and one of the leaders of the short-lived Bavarian Council Republic
 Eugen Netto (1848–1919), German mathematician
 Eugen Richter (1838–1906), German politician in Imperial Germany
 Eugen Rosenstock-Huessy (1888–1973), German historian and social philosopher
 Eugen Sandow (1867–1925), Prussian bodybuilder and showman born Friedrich Wilhelm Müller
 Eugen Sänger (1905–1964), Austrian aerospace engineer
 Eugen Schauman (1875–1904), Swedish-speaking Finnish nationalist, nobleman, and assassin
 Eugen Schileru (1916–1968), Romanian art and literary critic, essayist, and translator
 Eugen Simion (1933–2022), Romanian literary critic, historian, and academician
 Eugén Strömberg (1895–1971), Swedish military doctor
 Eugen Trică (born 1976), Romanian football manager and former player
 Eugen Țurcanu (1925–1954), Romanian communist criminal and torturer
 Eugen Weidmann (1908–1939), German criminal and serial killer, last person publicly executed in France
 Eugen Zasavițchi (born 1992), Moldovan footballer

See also
 Eugene (given name)

Estonian masculine given names
Romanian masculine given names